is a Japanese physicist and inventor, often cited as the inventor of carbon nanotubes.  Although carbon nanotubes had been observed prior to his "invention", Iijima's 1991 paper generated unprecedented interest in the carbon nanostructures and has since fueled intense research in the area of nanotechnology.

Born in Saitama Prefecture in 1939, Iijima graduated with a Bachelor of Engineering degree in 1963 from the University of Electro-Communications, Tokyo. He received a Master's degree in 1965 and completed his Ph.D. in solid-state physics in 1968, both at Tohoku University in Sendai.

Between 1970 and 1982 he performed research with crystalline materials and high-resolution electron microscopy at Arizona State University. He visited the University of Cambridge during 1979 to perform studies on carbon materials.

He worked for the Research Development Corporation of Japan from 1982 to 1987, studying ultra-fine particles, after which he joined NEC Corporation where he is still employed. He discovered carbon nanotubes in 1991.  When he discovered carbon nanotubes, he not only took pictures of them but he put two together and explained what they really are.  Afterwards, he was credited with the discovery.  He is also a University Professor at Meijo University since 1999.  Furthermore, he is the Honorary AIST Fellow of the National Institute of Advanced Industrial Science and Technology, Distinguished Invited University Professor of Nagoya University.

He was awarded the Benjamin Franklin Medal in Physics in 2002, "for the discovery and elucidation of the atomic structure and helical character of multi-wall and single-wall carbon nanotubes, which have had an enormous impact on the rapidly growing condensed matter and materials science field of nanoscale science and electronics."

He is a foreign associate of National Academy of Sciences, foreign member of the Norwegian Academy of Science and Letters.
He is also a Member of the Japan Academy.

Research fields
Nano Science, Crystallography, Electron Microscopy, Solid-State Physics, Materials Science

Professional record
 1968 – 1974: Research Associate, Research Institute for Scientific Measurements, Tohoku University, Sendai
 1970 – 1977: Research Associate, Department of Physics, Arizona State University, Tempe, Arizona
 1977 – 1982: Senior Research Associate, Center for Solid State Science, Arizona State University, Tempe, Arizona
 1979: Visiting Senior Scientist, Department of Metallurgy and Materials Science, University of Cambridge, Cambridge
 1982 – 1987: Group Leader, ERATO Program, Research Development Corporation of Japan, Nagoya
 1987 – Present: Senior Research Fellow, NEC Corporation, Tsukuba (Joined NEC in 1987 as Senior Principal Researcher)
 1998 – 2002: Research Director, JST/ICORP "Nanotubulites" Project Tsukuba and Nagoya
 1999 – Present: University Professor, Meijo University, Nagoya
 2001 – 2015: Director, Nanotube Research Center, National Institute of Advanced Industrial Science and Technology (AIST), Tsukuba
 2005 – 2012: Dean, SKKU Advanced Institute of Nanotechnology (SAINT, http://saint.skku.edu), Sungkyunkwan University, Suwon, Korea.
 2006 – 2009: Project Reader, NEDO “Carbon Nanotube Capacitor Development Project”
 2007 – Present: Distinguished University Professor of Nagoya University, Nagoya
 2008 – 2012: Distinguished Invited Chair Professor for World Class University (WCU) Program, Sungkyunkwan University, Suwon, Korea.
 2015 – Present: Honorary AIST Fellow, National Institute of Advanced Industrial Science and Technology (AIST)

Academy
 2007: Foreign Associate, The National Academy of Sciences
 2009: Foreign Member, The Norwegian Academy of Science and Letters.
 2010: Member, The Japan Academy
 2011: Foreign Fellow, Chinese Academy of Science

Recognition

Honors
 2000: Fellow, The American Physical Society
 2001: Honorary Fellowship, Royal Microscopical Society
 2002: Honorary Doctor, University of Antwerp
 2002: Honorary Member, The Crystallographic Society of Japan
 2003: Honorary Doctor, École Polytechnique Fédérale de Lausanne(EPFL)
 2004: Honorary Member, The Japanese Society of Microscopy
 2005: Honorary Professor, Xi’an Jiaotong University
 2005: Honorary Professor, Peking University
 2007: Fellow, The Japan Society of Applied Physics
 2009: Fellow, The Microscopy Society of America
 2009: Honorary Member, The Chemical Society of Japan
 2009: Honorary Professor, Tsinghua University
 2009: Distinguished Professor, The University of Electro-Communications
 2010: Honorary Professor, Zhejiang University
 2010: Honorary Professor, Southeast University
 2014: Honorary Doctor, Aalto University

Major awards
 1976: Bertram Eugene Warren Diffraction Physics Award, (The American Crystallography Society)
 1985: Nishina Memorial Award, (The Nishina Memorial Foundation)
 1996: Asahi Prize, (The Asahi Shinbun Cultural Foundation)
 2002: Agilent EuroPhysics Prize, (European Physical Society)
 2002: James C. McGroddy Prize for New Materials, (American Physical Society)
 2002: Benjamin Franklin Medal in Physics, (The Franklin Institute)
 2002: Japan Academy Award and Imperial Award, (The Japan Academy)
 2003: Person of Cultural Merit, Japan
 2007: Gregori Aminoff Prize in crystallography 2007, (Royal Swedish Academy of Sciences)
 2007: Fujihara Award, (The Fujihara Foundation of Science)
 2007: Balzan Prize for Nanoscience 2007 
 2008: The Kavli Prize Nanoscience 2008 (The Kavli Foundation)
 2008: The Prince of Asturias Award for Technical Scientific Research 2008, (The Prince of Asturias Foundation)
 2009: Order of Culture, Japan
 2015: European Inventor Award (European Patent Office, Germany)
 2017: Sir C. V. Raman Visiting Professorship award for CNT (University of Madras, Chennai, India) during 6–13 March 2017. 
 and others

References

External links

"About Myself" – NEC's page about Dr. Sumio Iijima
"Nanotubulites" – about Dr. Sumio Iijima
Nanotubes: The Materials of the 21st Century – video presentation by Sumio Iijima
Arizona State University story on Kavli Prize

1939 births
Living people
Japanese nanotechnologists
Japanese inventors
Japanese physicists
Fellows of the Royal Microscopical Society
Foreign associates of the National Academy of Sciences
Foreign members of the Chinese Academy of Sciences
Microscopists
Carbon scientists
Members of the Norwegian Academy of Science and Letters
NEC people
People from Saitama Prefecture
Recipients of the Order of Culture
Tohoku University alumni
University of Electro-Communications alumni
Kavli Prize laureates in Nanoscience
Fellows of the American Physical Society